The Battle of Sliva occurred in an area known as Sliva in the city of Kruševo, in Ottoman Macedonia on the August 12, 1903. It was an important episode of Ilinden–Preobrazhenie Uprising which occurred 10 days after the Kruševo Republic was proclaimed back on August 2, 1903, and eventually lead to the fall of the Republic and to the suppression of the uprising.

The Internal Macedonian Revolutionary Organisation was unorganised for this battle. Many 16- and 17-year-old men were also involved in this battle even though men were drafted at the age of 18 to join the army.

The battle saw the Ottoman Army up against the Kruševo Republic and the IMRO. The IMRO had a force of 500 to 600 revolutionaries commanded by Todor Hristov, while the Ottoman Army had a total of 3,000 to 3,100 soldiers.

The Ottoman Army army saw a victory and had captured some of the Bulgarian rebels.

References

Sources
 MI-AN Publishing, Skopje 1998, Macedonia Yesterday And Today

Kruševo Republic
Ottoman Kruševo
Internal Macedonian Revolutionary Organization
1903 in the Ottoman Empire
Sliva
Military history of North Macedonia
August 1903 events